Oualogo, also spelt Oualgo, is a commune in the Baskouré Department of Kouritenga Province in the Centre-Est region of Burkina Faso. It had a population of 727 in 2006.

In the 1985 census, a related settlement known as Oualogo-Peulh was described as having a population of 132.

Demographics

Neighbourhoods

References 

Populated places in the Centre-Est Region